"That's What Your Love Does to Me" is a song written by Chick Rains and Bill Caswell, and recorded by American country music artist Holly Dunn.  It was released in June 1988 as the first single from the album Across the Rio Grande.  The song reached #5 on the Billboard Hot Country Singles & Tracks chart.

Other versions
 Michael Johnson originally recorded the song on his 1986 album Wings.
 The song was also recorded by The Forester Sisters on their 1987 album You Again.

Charts

Weekly charts

Year-end charts

References

1988 singles
1986 songs
Michael Johnson (singer) songs
The Forester Sisters songs
Holly Dunn songs
MTM Records singles
Songs written by Chick Rains
Songs written by Bill Caswell